The State University of Feira de Santana (UEFS) is a public institution of higher education in Brazil, based in the city of Feira de Santana, Bahia. Until the 1990s, was also the only university in this city.

Currently, the university has 27 graduate courses, offering 765 places by year for the third degree, with an average of 17.85 candidates per seat.

External links
University's website

Educational institutions established in 1976
Universities and colleges in Bahia
1976 establishments in Brazil

Bahia
Feira de Santana